Manuel García Calderón García Rama (born 28 September 1953) is a Spanish football manager, currently in charge of CD Móstoles B.

Managerial career
Born in Madrid, García Calderón made his managerial debuts with Real Madrid's youth system. In 1996, he was appointed CD Toledo manager in Segunda División, after previous stints at CD Numancia and CD San Fernando; while in charge he only suffered two defeats, and his side finished 9th.

In August 1997, after suffering team relegation with SD Huesca, García Calderón was named Getafe CF manager. He was relieved from his duties in April of the following year, after losing his last three games.

García Calderón subsequently managed Algeciras CF, AD Alcorcón and CD Móstoles, all in Segunda División B. On 28 June 2006 he was appointed at the helm of CD Illescas, being sacked on 7 November of the following year.

On 18 June 2008 García Calderón returned to his former club Getafe, being appointed manager of the reserves. He was relieved from his duties on 9 January 2009, after achieving five consecutive defeats.

In 2014 García Calderón was named manager of the newly formed CD Móstoles B.

References

External links

1953 births
Living people
Sportspeople from Madrid
Spanish football managers
Segunda División managers
Segunda División B managers
Tercera División managers
CD Toledo managers
CD Numancia managers
SD Huesca managers
Getafe CF managers
Algeciras CF managers
AD Alcorcón managers